Steven Mungandu (born 6 May 1995) is a Zambian judoka. He competed in the 2020 Summer Olympics.

References

External links
 

1995 births
Living people
Sportspeople from Lusaka
Sportspeople from Paris
Judoka at the 2020 Summer Olympics
Zambian male judoka
Olympic judoka of Zambia
African Games competitors for Zambia
Competitors at the 2019 African Games